Alexander Morgan (born 18 July 1994) is an Australian male road and track cyclist. At the 2013 UCI Track Cycling World Championships he won the gold medal in the team pursuit event. He also competed and finished 4th in the individual pursuit.

References

External links
 
 
 

1994 births
Living people
Australian male cyclists
Place of birth missing (living people)
UCI Track Cycling World Champions (men)
Australian track cyclists